ThinkBright TV was a PBS television digital subchannel serving New York outside of New York City. Its programming included educational series, lifelong learning, arts and culture, children's shows and public affairs coverage with a focus on New York's people, places and heritage.

History
ThinkBright & Well began as ThinkBright Lifelong Learning. ThinkBright Lifelong Learning included a television channel and an online service that supported and enhanced the educational experiences of teachers, students, families, and adult learners throughout New York State .

Started in July 2002 with a $2.5 million grant from The John R. Oishei Foundation, WNED began to harness digital technology to create a lifelong learning educational service. On Oct. 1, 2007, the service expanded to include all of upstate New York . New York State viewers can tune into a whole new selection of public broadcasting programs, including educational series, arts and cultural specials, public affairs forums and high-quality children's shows through ThinkBright. Programs that highlight New York State issues, people, places and heritage will also be featured. Via a statewide network feed from ThinkBright's originating station, WNED in Buffalo.

At one point, ThinkBright programming was available for twelve hours a day on all New York PBS member stations except for those serving the New York City area. As stations such as WCFE-TV, WCNY-TV and WXXI-TV left ThinkBright, the regional network was reduced to a handful of participating digital member stations.

 WPBS-DT 16.2 Watertown / WNPI-DT 18.2 Norwood (Potsdam)
 WMHT 17.2 Schenectady (Troy-Albany)
 WNED-TV 17.3 Buffalo and Western NY
 WSKG-TV 46.3 Binghamton / WSKA 30.3 Corning-Elmira

In most markets, it occupied these subchannels for twelve hours per day, with the remaining timeslots allocated to other programming sources such as Create.

Closure
In 2011, ThinkBright suspended formal operations as a statewide network, and both the originating station WNED and most of the affiliates affiliated with the World network (informally known as PBS World) for their former ThinkBright dayparts.

The "ThinkBright" brand was revived in 2016, co-branded with Create only on WNED.

See also
WNED-TV (Western New York Public Broadcasting Association)

References 

Television networks in the United States
Public Broadcasting Service
Public television in the United States
Defunct television networks in the United States
Television channels and stations established in 2001
Television channels and stations disestablished in 2011
2001 establishments in New York (state)
2011 disestablishments in New York (state)